Tudoranca Ciurea (9 July 1888–24 February 1971) was a Romanian Land Forces brigadier general during World War II. 

He advanced in rank to lieutenant colonel in 1932, and to colonel in 1937. In June 1940 he was awarded the Order of the Star of Romania, Officer class. In January 1942, he was replaced as prefect by Colonel . 

In early 1942 Ciurea was promoted to brigadier general, and served as Commanding Officer Infantry 1st Frontier Division. In 1943 he was named General Officer Commanding 4th Infantry Division, General Officer Commanding 4th Mountain Division (Vânători de munte), and finally General Officer Commanding Special Reparation Corps. Ciurea retired in November 1944. In May 1945 he was awarded the Order of the Star of Romania, Commander class.

References

External links

1888 births
1971 deaths
Romanian Land Forces generals
Romanian military personnel of World War II
Commanders of the Order of the Star of Romania
Prefects of Romania